Poliopastea mirabilis is a moth in the subfamily Arctiinae. It was described by Max Wilhelm Karl Draudt in 1917. It is found in Colombia.

References

Moths described in 1917
Euchromiina